is a Japanese sports sailor.

At the 2008 Summer Olympics, she competed in the women's 470 class with Naoko Kamata, finishing in 14th place.  At the 2012 Summer Olympics, she competed in the same event, finishing in 14th place again, with her teammate this time being Wakako Tabata. At the 2016 Summer Olympics, she competed in the same event with Miho Yoshioka, finishing in 5th place.

For the 2018 Women's 470 World Championships, Yoshida teamed up with Miho Yoshioka winning gold. For the 2019 Women's 470 World Championships, Yoshida teamed up with Miho Yoshioka again, winning silver.

References

External links
 
 
 
 

1980 births
Living people
Japanese female sailors (sport)
Olympic sailors of Japan
Sailors at the 2008 Summer Olympics – 470
Sailors at the 2012 Summer Olympics – 470
Sailors at the 2016 Summer Olympics – 470
Sailors at the 2020 Summer Olympics – 470
Asian Games gold medalists for Japan
Asian Games medalists in sailing
Sailors at the 2006 Asian Games
Sailors at the 2010 Asian Games
Sailors at the 2018 Asian Games
Medalists at the 2006 Asian Games
Medalists at the 2010 Asian Games
Medalists at the 2018 Asian Games
Snipe class sailors